Mintopola is a genus of moths in the subfamily Arctiinae. The genus was erected by Schaus in 1899.

Species
 Mintopola braziliensis Schaus, 1899
 Mintopola dipartita Reich, 1936

References

External links

Lithosiini
Moth genera